Multidentia castaneae is a species of flowering plants in the family Rubiaceae. It is endemic to Tanzania.

Sources 

Endemic flora of Tanzania
Multidentia
Vulnerable plants
Taxonomy articles created by Polbot
Taxa named by Diane Mary Bridson
Taxa named by Frans Hubert Edouard Arthur Walter Robyns
Taxa named by Bernard Verdcourt